Pterolophia caudata is a species of beetle in the family Cerambycidae. It was described by Henry Walter Bates in 1873.

Subspecies
 Pterolophia caudata curtipennis Makihara, 1980
 Pterolophia caudata caudata (Bates, 1873)

References

caudata
Beetles described in 1873